Heterocyclic antidepressants inhibit the nerve cells' ability to reuptake norepinephrine and serotonin. This group of drugs, once the mainstay of treatment, include:

 Tricyclic antidepressants
 Tetracyclic antidepressants
 Tiazesim, an old antidepressant that is tricyclic and heterocyclic.

Antidepressants